New Hometown may refer to:
"New Hometown", a song by Sara Evans from the album Real Fine Place
"New Hometown", a song by Mike Ryan
New Hometown, an album by the band The Southern Gothic